Delta Academy is a private school in Marks, Mississippi, United States. It serves K-12, with elementary school, junior high school, and high school.

References

External links
 

Education in Quitman County, Mississippi
Private high schools in Mississippi
Private middle schools in Mississippi
Private elementary schools in Mississippi